The Landing Craft Tank (Rocket) or LCT(R) was developed from the British Mk.2 and Mk.3 Landing Craft Tank (LCT) during the Second World War. It was designed to saturate beaches with either 972 or 1,044 rockets prior to the landing of troops. Used by both British and U.S. forces, the craft saw service in the Normandy landings, the Mediterranean and the Far East.

Design

The front loading door was welded shut and an additional deck installed above the tank storage bay to provide a mounting for the rocket launching racks. The resulting storage space below the deck (formerly the tank deck) was informally subdivided with canvas sheets to provide additional crew space. These were later updated with wooden partitions. The craft was also fitted with a Type 970 radar set whose primary use was for rangefinding, but was also successfully used for navigation. Generally propulsion was provided by Paxman diesel engines, however, others were used due to availability.  Some U.S. craft were fitted with petrol (gasoline) engines.

Application

The batteries of  rocket projectors carried by each LCT(R) fired salvoes of rockets in rapid succession, triggered electronically by an officer located in the bridge wheelhouse. The remainder of the seventeen man crew took shelter, at the point of firing, in the below-deck space described above.

Notes

External links

 
 

LCT
Rocket artillery
Military vehicles introduced from 1940 to 1944
English inventions